Mannadipet is a legislative assembly constituency in the Union territory of Puducherry in India. This constituency covers a part of the area under Mannadipet Commune Panchayat. Mannadipet assembly constituency is a part of the Puducherry Lok Sabha constituency.

In the 2011 Puducherry legislative assembly election, the Mannadipet seat was won by T. P. R. Selvame of the All India N.R. Congress, who beat K.P.K. Arul Murugan of Pattali Makkal Katchi by a margin of 4716 votes.

Members of Legislative Assembly

Election results

2021

References 

Assembly constituencies of Puducherry